Back 2 Back 3 is a 2-disc DJ mix by German trance duo Cosmic Gate from the series Back 2 Back. Released October 29, 2007, each disc in the volume contained mixed songs by the likes of Markus Schulz, Tiësto and other DJs. It was released on Black Hole Recordings.

Track listing

Disc 1
 Cosmic Gate - B2B3 Intro
 Adam K & Soha - Twilight
 Marcel Woods - New Feeling (Nic Chagall Remix/Cosmic Gate's B2B3 Dub)
 Patric La Funk - Unisono
 Above & Beyond - Home (Wippenberg Remix)
 Nic Chagall - Back To San Fran
 Moonbeam - Cocoon (Moon Mix)
 Ricky Stone & Lou Swimmin - Pure (Dub Mix)
 Andrew Bennett Feat. Kirsty Hawkshaw - Heaven Sent (Andrew Bennett & Tom Cloud Vocal Mix)
 Johan Gielen -  Okinawa Sunset (Andy Duguid Remix)
 Marcus Schössow - Mr. White (Ruben De Ronde Remix)
 D. Ramirez & Mark Knight - Colombian Soul (Gabriel & Dresden Tuscan Soul Reconstruction)
 First State Feat. Anita Kelsey - Falling
 Wippenberg Pres. Sphæra - Back
 Plastic Angel - Try Walking In My World
 Cosmic Gate - A Day That Fades (Cosmic Gate's From AM To PM Mix/B2B3 Edit)

Disc 2
 Tiësto Feat. Jes-  Everything (Cosmic Gate B2B3 Intro Mix)
 Re-Ward - Ensure
 Terry Ferminal - Deep Inside
 Genix - Phused (Marcus Schössow Remix)
 Cosmic Gate Feat. Denise Rivera - Body Of Conflict (Cosmic Gate Club Mix)
 David Forbes - Rescue
  Markus Schulz - Fly To Colors (Genix Remix)
 Tatana - I Can (Duderstadt Uplifting Dub)
 Vincent De Moor -  Fly Away (Cosmic Gate Remix) 
 Bart Claessen - First Light
 Messler - Prepare (Cosmic Gate B2B3 Edit)
 Groove Garcia - Code 
 Cosmic Gate - Fire Wire (Cosmic Gate B2B3 Reconstruction)
 Cosmic Gate - Consciousness 

2007 remix albums
Cosmic Gate albums
DJ mix albums